Saugy is a commune in the Cher department in the Centre-Val de Loire region of France.

Geography
The commune borders the department of Indre.

Population

Sights
 The church of St. Ursule, dating from the twelfth century.

See also
Communes of the Cher department

References

Communes of Cher (department)